{{Taxobox
| image = 
| image_caption = 
| regnum = Animalia
| phylum = Mollusca
| classis = Gastropoda
| unranked_superfamilia = clade Heterobranchia
clade Euthyneura
clade Nudipleura
clade Nudibranchia
clade Euctenidiacea
clade Doridacea
| superfamilia = Polyceroidea
| familia = Polyceridae
| genus = Thecacera
| species = T. boyla
| binomial = Thecacera boyla| binomial_authority = Willan, 1989
| synonyms = 
}}Thecacera boyla is a species of sea slug, a dorid nudibranch, a marine gastropod mollusc in the family Polyceridae.

Distribution
This species was first described from Queensland, Australia.

Description
This polycerid nudibranch is translucent grey in colour, with extensive mottled patches of light and dark green pigment.

References

Goniodorididae
Gastropods described in 1989